The Jersey J Cup, also known as the Chris Candido Memorial J-Cup Tournament, is an annual professional wrestling tournament held by Funkdafied Wrestling Federation (FwF), typically between April and June. Modeled after the Super J-Cup by New Japan Pro-Wrestling, it is the second-oldest tournament in United States after the East Coast Wrestling Association's Super 8 Tournament.

The wrestlers in the tournament are typically junior heavyweight wrestlers from independent promotions all over North America. The tournament has been hosted by New Jersey-based Jersey Championship Wrestling (2000-2004), National Wrestling Superstars (2005-2012) and Funkdafied Wrestling Federation (2013- ). These promotions have held a combined 11 J-Cup tournaments. No wrestler has ever won the tournament twice, however, a number of participants have entered the tournament multiple times. Devon Moore is the wrestler who has participated in the most J-Cups as he has wrestled in all NWS tournaments except the 2007 tournament. His participation in the 2010 tournament marked his 5th Jersey J-Cup tournament.

History and format
The tournament was formed in 2000 by Jersey Championship Wrestling. It was originally created by JCW founder Ricky Otazu, inspired by the success of the ECWA Super 8 Tournament, as an American counterpart to New Japan Pro-Wrestling's Super J-Cup to showcase the top independent wrestlers in the country. The tournament was regularly hosted by JCW until its close in 2004 whereupon it was taken over by National Wrestling Superstars.

In 2005, shortly after purchasing the rights to the J-Cup Tournament, NWS promoter Joe Panzarino announced that the tournament would be renamed the Chris Candido Memorial J-Cup Tournament, and the J-Cup renamed the Chris Candido Memorial J-Cup Trophy. Subsequently, the tournament has been changed with the opening rounds consisting of three-way elimination matches to reduce the duration of the event while keeping the same number of competitors. Since 2007, it has also grown to include separate tournaments for female wrestlers and tag teams.

Tournament winners

2000
The 2000 JCW Jersey J-Cup was a two-block, 16-man tournament held on May 12, 2000, at Paramus High School in Paramus, New Jersey. Wrestlers from seven promotions, including Jersey Championship Wrestling, were represented at the inaugural tournament including the CyberSpace Wrestling Federation, East Coast Pro Wrestling, Jersey All Pro Wrestling, NWA New York, Outlaws of Wrestling and World Xtreme Wrestling.

Judas Young won the tournament by winning four matches at the event. Over the course of the evening, he defeated Homicide in the opening round, Crazy Ivan in the quarter-finals, Low Ki in the semi-finals and Ryan Wing in the final match. Ryan Wing, hometown hero and favorite to win the tournament, made a surprise "heel turn" arrogantly criticizing the fans and brought out his "mother", Mrs. Wing, to be in his corner during his match against Judas Young. It was a failed attempt at outside interference, an ill-timed slap that accidentally hit her son, that allowed Young to pin Wing with a schoolboy rollup for the win.

Results
May 12, 2000 in Paramus, New Jersey (Paramus High School)

Tournament bracket
Pin-Pinfall; Sub-Submission; CO-Countout; DCO-Double countout; DQ-Disqualification; Ref-Referee's decision

2001
The 2001 JCW Jersey J-Cup was a two-block, 16-man tournament held on June 23, 2001, at the JCW Arena in Lodi, New Jersey. Wrestlers from nine promotions, including Jersey Championship Wrestling, were represented at the tournament including the CyberSpace Wrestling Federation, Eastern Wrestling Federation, Heartland Wrestling Association, Jersey All Pro Wrestling, Maryland Championship Wrestling, Outlaws of Wrestling, Ultimate Championship Wrestling and World Xtreme Wrestling.

Low Ki won the tournament by winning four matches at the event. Over the course of the evening, he defeated Xavier in the opening round, Joel Maximo in the quarter-finals, Shark Boy in the semi-finals and Queenan Creed in the final match. In addition to the tournament, a special challenge match was held as one of the two semi-main events pitting former Extreme Championship Wrestling wrestler Julio Dinero against Rick Ratchet who mas making his in-ring return after being out of action for six months due to an injury.

Results
June 23, 2001 in Lodi, New Jersey (JCW Arena)

Tournament bracket
Pin-Pinfall; Sub-Submission; CO-Countout; DCO-Double countout; DQ-Disqualification; Ref-Referee's decision

2002
The 2002 JCW Jersey J-Cup was a two-block, 16-man tournament held on June 15, 2002, at the Rex Plex in Elizabeth, New Jersey. Wrestlers from fourteen promotions, including Jersey Championship Wrestling, were represented at the tournament including Chikara, the East Coast Wrestling Association, Impact Championship Wrestling, IPW Hardcore, IWA Mid-South, Jersey All Pro Wrestling, Maryland Championship Wrestling, NWA New England, Ring of Honor, 3PW, USA Pro Wrestling, World Wrestling All-Stars and World Xtreme Wrestling.

Reckless Youth won the tournament by winning four matches at the event. Over the course of the evening, he defeated The Insane Dragon in the opening round, CM Punk in the quarter-finals, AJ Styles in the semi-finals and American Dragon in the final match. In addition to the tournament, a singles match between Inferno and Jay Briscoe was held as one of the two semi-main events.

Results
June 15, 2002 in Elizabeth, New Jersey (Rex Plex)

Tournament bracket
Pin-Pinfall; Sub-Submission; CO-Countout; DCO-Double countout; DQ-Disqualification; Ref-Referee's decision

2003
The 2003 JCW Jersey J-Cup was a two-block, 16-man tournament held on August 24, 2003, at the Garfield Boys and Girls Club in Garfield, New Jersey. Wrestlers from several promotions, including Jersey Championship Wrestling, were represented at the tournament including Combat Zone Wrestling, IWA Mid-South, Jersey All Pro Wrestling and the New York Wrestling Connection .

Jay Lethal won the tournament by winning four matches at the event. Over the course of the evening, he defeated Rob Eckos in the opening round, CM Punk in the quarter-finals, Jimmy Jacobs in the semi-finals and Homicide in the final match. In addition to the tournament, a singles match between Striker and Jonny Storm was held as one of the two semi-main events. The tournament also opened with a tag team match for the JCW Tag Team Championship between the champions, Los Boricuas, and the challengers, The Disciples Of Darling, in which Los Boricuas retained the championship via disqualification.

Results
August 24, 2003 in Garfield, New Jersey (Garfield Boys and Girls Club)

Tournament bracket
Pin-Pinfall; Sub-Submission; CO-Countout; DCO-Double countout; DQ-Disqualification; Ref-Referee's decision

2004
The 2004 JCW Jersey J-Cup was a two-block, 16-man tournament held on June 27, 2004, at the Garfield Boys and Girls Club in Garfield, New Jersey. Wrestlers from nine promotions, including Jersey Championship Wrestling, were represented at the tournament including the Combat Zone Wrestling, East Coast Wrestling Association, Full Impact Pro, Lucha Xtreme Wrestling, New York Wrestling Connection, 3PW and Zero-1.

Super Dragon won the tournament by winning four matches at the event. Over the course of the evening, he defeated Altar Boy Luke in the opening round, Shawn Sheridan in the quarter-finals, M-Dogg 20 in the semi-finals and B-Boy in the final match; Super Dragon was also awarded the vacant JCW Light Heavyweight Championship. In addition to the tournament, the semi-main event was a standard wrestling match for the JCW Heavyweight Championship between the champion, Slyk Wagner Brown, and the challenger, Homicide, in which Homicide won the championship.

Results
June 27, 2004 in Garfield, New Jersey (Garfield Boys and Girls Club)

Tournament bracket
Pin-Pinfall; Sub-Submission; CO-Countout; DCO-Double countout; DQ-Disqualification; Ref-Referee's decision

2005
The 2005 NWS Jersey J-Cup was a two-block, 16-man tournament held on April 30, 2005, at the Recreation Station Arena in Toms River, New Jersey. The show opened with a tribute to Chris Candido followed by a formal announcement by National Wrestling Superstars, which had recently purchased the rights to the J-Cup, that the tournament would be renamed the Chris Candido Memorial J-Cup Tournament, and the J-Cup itself as the Candido Memorial J-Cup Trophy. It also introduced a new concept in which the opening rounds consisted of Fatal Four Way matches. This reduced the duration of the tournament, eliminating the quarter-finals, while keeping the same number of participants and allowed additional non-tournament matches.

Mike Kruel won the tournament by winning four matches at the event. Over the course of the evening, he defeated Damian Adams, Slayer and Steve Zapf in the opening round, Trent Acid in the semi-finals and Azriael in the final match; Kruel was presented the trophy by Candido's family after the match. In addition to the tournament, there were two championship matches on the undercard; WXW Heavyweight Champion Bison Bravado defended his title against Funky White Boy and AWA Heavyweight Champion Danny Demanto wrestled JD Smooth, both defeating their opponents.

Results
April 30, 2005 in Toms River, New Jersey (Recreation Station Arena)

2006
The 2006 NWS Jersey J-Cup was a two-block, 16-man tournament held on April 29, 2006, at the VFW Hall in Manville, New Jersey. The opening rounds were held as three-man elimination matches.

Grim Reefer won the tournament by winning three matches at the event. Over the course of the evening, he defeated Archadia and Ghanda Rhea Akbar in the opening round, Devon Moore in the semi-finals and Deranged in the final match. In addition to the tournament, a 6-man tag team "grudge" match between Bison Bravado, TNT and Shane Taylor defeated The Famous Clown, Ice Pick Lowinski and Bulldog Collare. Another featured match was WWF Hall of Famer Jimmy “Superfly” Snuka, accompanied by Captain Lou Albano against Johnny Candido, which Snuka won.

Results
April 29, 2006 in Manville, New Jersey (VFW Hall)

2007
The 2007 NWS Jersey J-Cup was a two-block, 8-man tournament held on April 21, 2007, at the VFW Hall in Manville, New Jersey. This was the first and only time since 2005 that the tournament was held as a standard single-elimination tournament and with less than 16 participants.

Deranged won the tournament by winning three matches at the event. Over the course of the evening, he defeated Mikey Pacifica in the opening round, Jorge Santi in the semi-finals and NWS Junior Heavyweight Champion Gavin Quest in the final match. In addition to the tournament, two tag team matches were held. The first, an intergender tag team match, matched 2006 NWS King and Queen of the Ring Danny Demanto and Melissa Stripes against 2006 J-Cup winners Grim Reeper and Alexa; the former team was later replaced with Bison Bravado and Amber. The second featured bout was a 6-man tag team match with Greg "The Hammer" Valentine, Salvatore Sincere and NWS Hardcore Champion Johnny Candido wrestling David Sammartino, "Indian Warrior" Draven and Rich "Ice Pick" Lowinski.

Results
April 21, 2007 in Manville, New Jersey (VFW Hall)

Tournament bracket
Pin-Pinfall; Sub-Submission; CO-Countout; DCO-Double countout; DQ-Disqualification; Ref-Referee's decision

2008
The 2008 NWS Jersey J-Cup was a two-block, 16-man tournament held on April 26, 2008, at the VFW Hall in Manville, New Jersey. The opening rounds were held as three-man elimination matches.

Rhett Titus won the tournament by winning three matches at the event. Over the course of the evening, he defeated Mikey Pacifica and Brett Thunder in the opening round, Nicky Oceans in the semi-finals and Drew Blood in the final match. In addition to the tournament, Scotty 2 Hotty wrestled Mike "G.Q." Quest, accompanied by Romeo Roselli, as part of the semi-event.

Results
April 26, 2008 in Manville, New Jersey (VFW Hall)

2009
The 2009 NWS Jersey J-Cup was a two-block, 16-man tournament held on May 16, 2009, at the VFW Hall in Manville, New Jersey. The opening rounds were held as Fatal Four Way matches.

Myke Quest won the tournament by winning four matches at the event. Over the course of the evening, he defeated Arachadia, Corvis Fear and Amasis in the opening round, Nicky Oceans in the semi-finals and Jay Lethal in the final match. In addition to the tournament, former Extreme Championship Wrestling alumni Balls Mahoney and Axl Rotten made a guest appearance to pay tribute to Chris Candido before the show; Mahoney later won a "Big Man Battle Royal" and wrestled Gene Snitsky in a Loser Goes Through a Door match in which the loser would be powerbombed though a door.

Results
May 16, 2009 in Manville, New Jersey (VFW Hall)

2010
The 2010 NWS Jersey J-Cup was a two-block, 16-man tournament held on May 14, 2010, at the Veterans Center in Kenilworth, New Jersey. The opening rounds were held as three-man elimination matches.

R. J. Brewer won the tournament by winning four matches at the event. Over the course of the evening, he defeated Jumping Joey Janela and Nick Talent in the opening round, Joel Maximo in the quarter-finals, Pat Buck in the semi-finals and Nicky Oceans in the final match. In addition to the tournament, Reality Check (Danny Demanto and Kevin Matthews) were declared the co-winners of a "Baker’s Dozen Heavyweight Battle Royal". The winner was to receive a match against former World Wrestling Federation superstar Kamala, however, an altercation with special guest referee The Patriot caused  to change it to a tag team match.

Results
May 14, 2010 in Kenilworth, New Jersey (Veterans Center)

2011
The 2011 NWS Jersey J-Cup was a two-block, 12-man tournament held on August 6, 2011, at the New Point Comfort Fire Company Hall in Keansburg, New Jersey. The opening rounds were held as three-man elimination matches.

Nicky Oceans won the tournament by winning three matches at the event. Over the course of the evening, he defeated "Jersey Shore Jock" Mike Dennis and Johnny in the opening round, Chris Steeler in the semi-finals, and Devon Moore in the final match. In addition to the tournament, 2 Rude Dudes (Rampage Rogers and Corey Havoc) were declared the co-winners of a "Baker’s Dozen Heavyweight Battle Royal".The winner was to receive a match against former World Wrestling Federation superstar Tommy Dream however, an altercation with special guest referee Johnny Candido (Chris Candido's brother) caused  to change it to a tag team match.

Results
August 11, 2011 in Keansburg, New Jersey (New Point Comfort Fire Company Hall)

See also
J-Cup Tournament
Super J-Cup

Notes

References

External links
2000 JCW Jersey J-Cup at JCWwrestling.com
2001 JCW Jersey J-Cup at JCWwrestling.com
2002 JCW Jersey J-Cup at JCWwrestling.com
2003 JCW Jersey J-Cup at JCWwrestling.com
2004 JCW Jersey J-Cup at JCWwrestling.com
2008 NWS Jersey J-Cup at NWSwrestling.com

Professional wrestling memorial shows
Professional wrestling tournaments
Professional wrestling in New Jersey
2000 in professional wrestling
2001 in professional wrestling
2002 in professional wrestling
2003 in professional wrestling
2004 in professional wrestling
2005 in professional wrestling
2006 in professional wrestling
2007 in professional wrestling
2008 in professional wrestling
2009 in professional wrestling
2010 in professional wrestling